Laureen Chew (born 1948) is an American academic and actress. She is Professor Emerita of Asian American studies at San Francisco State University. She's acted in two Wayne Wang films in the 1980s, both of which were shot in San Francisco.

Early life and education 
Chew was born and raised in Chinatown, San Francisco in 1948. She grew up around mostly other Chinese kids. Her parents owned a laundry shop. Chew attended a Catholic high school.

Chew was a part of the Third World Liberation Front and helped organized the Third World Liberation Front strikes of 1968 at San Francisco State University. She was arrested and jailed for 20 days for misdemeanor charges of disturbing the peace, illegal assembly and failing to disperse. At the end of the protest, San Francisco State established its College of Ethnic Studies.

Chew graduated from San Francisco State University with a BA in Chinese and a MA in Elementary Education. She received her EdD from the University of the Pacific.

Career 
Chew is a former elementary school teacher within the public education system.

Chew's first film credit was on Wayne Wang's Chan Is Missing (1982). Her second credit was on Wang's Dim Sum: A Little Bit of Heart (1985). Much of the film was shot in Chew's home, with her actual mother acting as her character's mother in the film.

Chew was the Elementary Education Department Chair 2001 to 2006. Chew was the Associate Dean of the College of Ethnic Studies from 2006 to 2012.

Filmography

References 

1948 births
Living people
San Francisco State University alumni
San Francisco State University faculty
University of the Pacific (United States) alumni
Activists from San Francisco
Actresses from San Francisco
American actresses of Chinese descent
Asian-American movement activists
20th-century American women educators
20th-century American educators
20th-century American actresses
21st-century American women educators
21st-century American educators